The World Interuniversity Games is an international sports event, which was organised by IFIUS (International Federation for Interuniversity Sport) each year in October. It is currently organised by Committee Panathlon Clubs of Universities, after IFIUS was disbanded and integrated inside Panathlon International in 2011.

IFIUS Games 
 1999 : Antwerp (Belgium)
 2000 : Paris (France)
 2001 : Amsterdam (the Netherlands)
 2002 : Barcelona (Spain)
 2003 : Rome (Italy)
 2004 : Antwerp (Belgium)
 2005 : Rotterdam (the Netherlands)
 2006 : Dublin (Ireland)
 2007 : Vienna (Austria)
 2008 : Budapest (Hungary)
 2009 : Milan (Italy)
 2010 : Valencia (Spain)
 2011 : Amsterdam (the Netherlands)
 2012 : Belgrade (Serbia)
 2013 : Antwerp (Belgium)

IFIUS Champions

2012 Belgrade 
 Football Men :  Institute of Physical Education and Sport (Tehran, Iran)
 Football Women :  Faculty of Sport, University of Belgrade (Belgrade, Serbia)
 Futsal Men :  University Ovidius Constanta (Constanta, Romania)
 Basketball Men :  Institute of Physical Education and Sport (Tehran, [Iran)
 Basketball Women :  Institute of Physical Education and Sport (Tehran, Iran)
 Volleyball Men :  Antwerp University Association (Antwerp, Belgium)
 Volleyball Women :  Faculty of Sport, University of Belgrade (Belgrade, Serbia)

2011 Amsterdam 

 Football Men :  University of Applied Sciences Wiener Neustadt (Wiener Neustadt, Austria)
 Football Women :  University Abderrahmane Mira de Bejaia (Algeria) (Béjaïa, Algeria)
 Futsal Men :  Islamic Azad University, Karaj Branch (Karaj, Iran)
 Basketball Men :  Islamic Azad University, Karaj Branch (Karaj, [Iran)
 Basketball Women :  Università Cattolica del Sacro Cuore (Milan, Rome, Italy)
 Volleyball Men :  Antwerp University Association (Antwerp, Belgium)
 Volleyball Women :  University of Bacău (Bacău, Romania)
 Golf and Pitch & Putt :  Mendeleyev University of Chemical Technology (Moscow, Russia) 
 Individual golf :  Volkov Roman, Mendeleyev University of Chemical Technology (Moscow, Russia) 
 Individual pitch & putt :  Grajdianu Ilia, Mendeleyev University of Chemical Technology (Moscow, Russia)

2010 Valencia 

 Football Men :  Karlsruhe Institute of Technology (Karlsruhe, Germany)
 Football Women :  Università Cattolica del Sacro Cuore (Milan, Rome, Italy)
 Futsal Men :  University Ovidius Constanta (Constanta, Romania)
 Basketball Men :  Pushkin Leningrad State University (Saint Petersburg, Russia)
 Basketball Women :  Moscow Agricultural Academy named after K.A. Timiryazev (Moscow, Russia)
 Volleyball Men :  Antwerp University Association (Antwerp, Belgium)
 Volleyball Women :  University of Bacău (Bacău, Romania)
 Golf and Pitch & Putt :  Universidad CEU Cardenal Herrera (Valencia, Spain)

2009 Milan 

 Football Men :  University of Nancy (Nancy, France)
 Football Women :  Università Cattolica del Sacro Cuore (Milan, Rome, Italy)
 Futsal Men :  University Ovidius Constanta (Constanta, Romania)
 Basketball Men :  University of Belgrade (Belgrade, Serbia)
 Basketball Women :  Università Cattolica del Sacro Cuore (Milan, Rome, Italy)
 Volleyball Men :  Islamic Azad University, Karaj Branch (Karaj, Iran)
 Volleyball Women :  University of Bacău (Bacău, Romania)
 Golf and Pitch & Putt :  Universidad CEU Cardenal Herrera (Valencia, Spain)

2008 Budapest 

 Football Men :  University of Nancy (Nancy, France)
 Football Women :  Catholic University Santa Maria La Antigua (Panama City, Panama])
 Futsal Men :  Islamic Azad University, Karaj Branch (Karaj, Iran)
 Basketball Men :  Pushkin Leningrad State University (Saint Petersburg, Russia)
 Basketball Women :  Budapest University (Budapest, Hungary)
 Volleyball Men :  Islamic Azad University, Karaj Branch (Karaj, Iran)
 Volleyball Women :  University of Bacău (Bacău, Romania)

2007 Vienna 

 Football Men :  Islamic Azad University (Tehran, Iran)
 Football Women :  The Hague University (The Hague, Netherlands)
 Futsal Men :  Mirny Polytechnic Institute (Mirny, Russia)
 Basketball Men :  Pushkin Leningrad State University (Saint Petersburg, Russia)
 Volleyball Men :  Islamic Azad University (Tehran, Iran)
 Volleyball Women :  University of Bacău (Bacău, Romania)

2006 Dublin 

 Football Men :  MESI (Moscow, Russia)
 Football Women :  The Hague University (The Hague, Netherlands)
 Futsal Men :  Mendeleyev University of Chemical Technology (Moscow, Russia)
 Basketball Men :  Pushkin Leningrad State University (Saint Petersburg, Russia)
 Volleyball Men :  Islamic Azad University (Tehran, Iran)
 Volleyball Women :  University of Sannio (Benevento, Italy)

2005 Rotterdam 

 Football Men :  University of Karlsruhe (Karlsruhe, Germany)
 Football Women :  Technical University Munich (Munich, Germany)
 Futsal Men :  Ukhta State Technical University (Ukhta, Russia)
 Basketball Men :  Pushkin Leningrad State University (Saint Petersburg, Russia)

2004 Antwerp 

 Football Men :  University of Erlangen-Nürnberg (Erlangen/Nuremberg, Germany)
 Football Women :  University of Erlangen-Nürnberg (Erlangen/Nuremberg, Germany)
 Futsal Men :  North-West Academy of Public Administration (Saint Petersburg, Russia)

2003 Rome 

 Football Men :  University of Erlangen-Nürnberg (Erlangen/Nuremberg, Germany)
 Football Women :  Catholic University of Leuven (Leuven, Belgium)
 Futsal Men :  University of Sevilla (Sevilla, Spain)

2002 Barcelona 

 Football Men :  University of Erlangen-Nürnberg (Erlangen/Nuremberg, Germany)
 Football Women :  University of Barcelona (Barcelona, Spain)

2001 Amsterdam 

 Football Men :  The Hague University (The Hague, Netherlands)
 Football Women :  University of the Basque Country (Bilbao/San Sébastian, Vitoria-Gasteiz Spain)

2000 Paris 

 Football Men :  University La Laguna Tenerife (San Cristóbal de La Laguna, Spain)
 Football Women :  University of the Basque Country (Bilbao/San Sébastian/Vitoria-Gasteiz, Spain)

1999 Antwerp 

 Football Men :  Trondheim NTNU University (Trondheim, Norway)

Medals table
Includes at this time medals won starting 2005. Updated until 2008 Games.

External links 
 IFIUS official site

 
Multi-sport events
Student sports competitions